An allegiance is a duty of fidelity said to be owed, or freely committed, by the people, subjects or citizens to their state or sovereign.

Etymology
The word allegiance comes from Middle English  (see Medieval Latin , "a liegance"). The al- prefix was probably added through confusion with another legal term, allegeance, an "allegation" (the French  comes from the English). Allegiance is formed from "liege," from Old French , "liege, free", of Germanic origin. The connection with Latin , "to bind," is erroneous.

Usage
Traditionally, English legal commentators used the term allegiance in two ways. In one sense, it referred to the deference which anyone, even foreigners, was expected to pay to the institutions of the country where one lived. In the other sense, it meant national character and the subjection due to that character.

Types
 Local allegiance
 Natural allegiance

United Kingdom
The English doctrine, which was at one time adopted in the United States, asserted that allegiance was indelible: "Nemo potest exuere patriam". As the law stood prior to 1870, every person who by birth or naturalisation satisfied the conditions set forth, even if removed in infancy to another country where their family resided, owed an allegiance to the British crown which they could never resign or lose, except by act of parliament or by the recognition of the independence or the cession of the portion of British territory in which they resided.

This refusal to accept any renunciation of allegiance to the Crown led to conflict with the United States over impressment, which led to further conflicts during the War of 1812, when thirteen Irish American prisoners of war were executed as traitors after the Battle of Queenston Heights; Winfield Scott urged American reprisal, but none was carried out.

Allegiance was the tie which bound the subject to the sovereign, in return for that protection which the sovereign afforded the subject. It was the mutual bond and obligation between monarch and subjects, whereby subjects were called their liege subjects, because they are bound to obey and serve them; and the monarch was called their liege lord, because they should maintain and defend them (Ex parte Anderson (1861) 3 El & El 487; 121 ER 525; China Navigation Co v Attorney-General (1932) 48 TLR 375; Attorney-General v Nissan [1969] 1 All ER 629; Oppenheimer v Cattermole [1972] 3 All ER 1106). The duty of the crown towards its subjects was to govern and protect them. The reciprocal duty of the subject towards the crown was that of allegiance.

At common law, allegiance was a true and faithful obedience of the subject due to their sovereign. As the subject owed to their sovereign their true and faithful allegiance and obedience, so the sovereign

  (Calvin's Case (1608) 7 Co Rep 1a; Jenk 306; 2 State Tr 559; 77 ER 377).

Natural allegiance and obedience is an incident inseparable to every subject, for parte Anderson (1861) 3 El & El 487; 121 ER 525). Natural-born subjects owe allegiance wherever they may be. Where territory is occupied in the course of hostilities by an enemy's force, even if the annexation of the occupied country is proclaimed by the enemy, there can be no change of allegiance during the progress of hostilities on the part of a citizen of the occupied country (R v Vermaak (1900) 21 NLR 204 (South Africa)).

Allegiance is owed both to the sovereign as a natural person  and to the sovereign in the political capacity (Re Stepney Election Petition, Isaacson v Durant (1886) 17 QBD 54 (per Lord Coleridge CJ)). Attachment to the person of the reigning sovereign is not sufficient. Loyalty requires affection also to the office of the sovereign, attachment to royalty, attachment to the law and to the constitution of the realm, and he who would, by force or by fraud, endeavour to prostrate that law and constitution, though he may retain his affection for its head, can boast but an imperfect and spurious species of loyalty (R v O'Connell (1844) 7 ILR 261).

There were four kinds of allegiances (Rittson v Stordy (1855) 3 Sm & G 230; De Geer v Stone (1882) 22 Ch D 243; Isaacson v Durant (1886) 54 LT 684; Gibson, Gavin v Gibson [1913] 3 KB 379; Joyce v DPP [1946] AC 347; Collingwood v Pace (1661) O Bridg 410; Lane v Bennett (1836) 1 M & W 70; Lyons Corp v East India Co (1836) 1 Moo PCC 175; Birtwhistle v Vardill (1840) 7 Cl & Fin 895; R v Lopez, R v Sattler (1858) Dears & B 525; Ex p Brown (1864) 5 B & S 280);

(a) Ligeantia naturalis, absoluta, pura et indefinita, and this originally is due by nature and birthright, and is called alta ligeantia, and those that owe this are called subditus natus;

(b) Ligeantia acquisita, not by nature but by acquisition or denization, being called a denizen, or rather denizon, because they are subditus datus;

(c) Ligeantia localis, by operation of law, when a friendly alien enters the country, because so long as they are in the country they are within the sovereign's protection, therefore they owe the sovereign a local obedience or allegiance (R v Cowle (1759) 2 Burr 834; Low v Routledge (1865) 1 Ch App 42; Re Johnson, Roberts v Attorney-General [1903] 1 Ch 821; Tingley v Muller [1917] 2 Ch 144; Rodriguez v Speyer [1919] AC 59; Johnstone v Pedlar [1921] 2 AC 262; R v Tucker (1694) Show Parl Cas 186; R v Keyn (1876) 2 Ex  D 63; Re Stepney Election Petn, Isaacson v Durant (1886) 17 QBD 54);

(d) A legal obedience, where a particular law requires the taking of an oath of allegiance by subject or alien alike.

Natural allegiance was acquired by birth within the sovereign's dominions (except for the issue of diplomats or of invading forces or of an alien in an enemy occupied territory). The natural allegiance and obedience are an incident inseparable from every subject, for as soon as they are born they owe by birthright allegiance and obedience to the Sovereign (Ex p. Anderson (1861) 3 E & E 487). A natural-born subject owes allegiance wherever they may be, so that where territory is occupied in the course of hostilities by an enemy's force, even if the annexation of the occupied country is proclaimed by the enemy, there can be no change of allegiance during the progress of hostilities on the part of a citizen of the occupied country (R v Vermaak (1900) 21 NLR 204 (South Africa)).

Acquired allegiance was acquired by naturalisation or denization. Denization, or ligeantia acquisita, appears to be threefold (Thomas v Sorrel (1673) 3 Keb 143);

 (a) absolute, as the common denization, without any limitation or restraint;
 (b) limited, as when the sovereign grants letters of denization to an alien, and the alien's male heirs, or to an alien for the term of their life;
 (c) It may be granted upon condition, cujus est dare, ejus est disponere, and this denization of an alien may come about three ways: by parliament; by letters patent, which was the usual manner; and by conquest.

Local allegiance was due by an alien while in the protection of the crown. All friendly resident aliens incurred all the obligations of subjects (The Angelique (1801) 3 Ch Rob App 7). An alien, coming into a colony, also became, temporarily, a subject of the crown, and acquired rights both within and beyond the colony, and these latter rights could not be affected by the laws of that colony (Routledge v Low (1868) LR 3 HL 100; 37 LJ Ch 454; 18 LT 874; 16 WR 1081, HL; Reid v Maxwell (1886) 2 TLR 790; Falcon v Famous Players Film Co [1926] 2 KB 474).

A resident alien owed allegiance even when the protection of the crown was withdrawn owing to the occupation of an enemy, because the absence of the crown's protection was temporary and involuntary (de Jager v Attorney-General of Natal [1907] AC 326).

Legal allegiance was due when an alien took an oath of allegiance required for a particular office under the crown.

By the Naturalisation Act 1870, it was made possible for British subjects to renounce their nationality and allegiance, and the ways in which that nationality is lost were defined. So British subjects voluntarily naturalized in a foreign state are deemed aliens from the time of such naturalization, unless, in the case of persons naturalized before the passing of the act, they had declared their desire to remain British subjects within two years from the passing of the act. Persons who, from having been born within British territory, are British subjects, but who, at birth, came under the law of any foreign state or of subjects of such state, and, also, persons who, though born abroad, are British subjects by reason of parentage, may, by declarations of alienage, get rid of British nationality. Emigration to an uncivilized country left British nationality unaffected: indeed the right claimed by all states to follow with their authority their subjects so emigrating was one of the usual and recognized means of colonial expansion.

United States
The doctrine that no man can cast off his native allegiance without the consent of his sovereign was early abandoned in the United States, and Chief Justice John Rutledge also declared in Talbot v. Janson, "a man may, at the same time, enjoy the rights of citizenship under two governments."  On July 27, 1868, the day before the Fourteenth Amendment was adopted, U.S. Congress declared in the preamble of the Expatriation Act that "the right of expatriation is a natural and inherent right of all people, indispensable to the enjoyment of the rights of life, liberty and the pursuit of happiness," and (Section I) one of "the fundamental principles of this government" (United States Revised Statutes, sec. 1999). Every natural-born citizen of a foreign state who is also an American citizen, and every natural-born American citizen who is also a citizen of a foreign land, owes a double allegiance, one to the United States, and one to their homeland (in the event of an immigrant becoming a citizen of the US) or to their adopted land (in the event of an emigrant natural-born citizen of the  US becoming a citizen of another nation). If these allegiances come into conflict, the person may be guilty of treason against one or both. If the demands of these two sovereigns upon their duty of allegiance come into conflict, those of the United States have the paramount authority in American law; likewise, those of the foreign land have paramount authority in their legal system. In such a situation, it may be incumbent on the individual to renounce one of their citizenships, to avoid possibly being forced into situations where countervailing duties are required of them, such as might occur in the event of war.

Oath of allegiance

The oath of allegiance is an oath of fidelity to the sovereign taken by all persons holding important public office and as a condition of naturalization. By ancient common law, it was required of all persons above the age of 12, and it was repeatedly used as a test for the disaffected. In England, it was first imposed by statute in the reign of Elizabeth I (1558), and its form has, more than once, been altered since. Up to the time of the revolution, the promise was "to be true and faithful to the king and his heirs, and truth and faith to bear of life and limb and terrene honour, and not to know or hear of any ill or damage intended him without defending him therefrom." This was thought to favour the doctrine of absolute non-resistance, and, accordingly, the Convention Parliament enacted the form that has been in use since that time – "I do sincerely promise and swear that I will be faithful and bear true allegiance to His Majesty ..."

In the United States and some other republics, the oath is known as the Pledge of Allegiance. Instead of declaring fidelity to a monarch, the pledge is made to the flag, the republic, and to the core values of the country, specifically liberty and justice. The reciting of the pledge in the United States is voluntary because of the rights guaranteed to the people under the First Amendment to the United States Constitution - specifically, the guarantee of freedom of speech, which inherently includes the freedom not to speak.

In Islam

The word used in the Arabic language for allegiance is bay'at (Arabic: بيعة), which means "taking hand". The practice is sanctioned in the Quran by Surah 48:10: "Verily, those who give thee their allegiance, they give it but to Allah Himself". The word is used for the oath of allegiance to an emir. It is also used for the initiation ceremony specific to many Sufi orders.

See also

 Impressment
 Legitimacy (political)
 Mandate of Heaven
 Renunciation of citizenship
 Treason
 Usurpation
 War of 1812
 Winfield Scott

References

Further reading
 Salmond on "Citizenship and Allegiance," in the Law Quarterly Review (July 1901, January 1902).

 
Nationalism

de:Loyalität
es:Lealtad
ko:충
no:Lojalitet
sv:Lojalitet